Lokesh Verma is an Indian tattoo artist. He is best known for pioneering soundwave tattoos in India. He is one of the founders of Heartwork Tattoo Festival, India’s only international tattoo festival.

Background and career 
Lokesh was born and raised in Delhi, India. His father worked in a security department, while mother was a teacher. He completed his school education in Delhi and took admission to Delhi University in 2000. He has held several odd jobs.

He started practicing tattooing in 2003 as a hobby while pursuing his MBA during which he also worked at the local McDonalds by day and as a disc jockey by night in order to save money to purchase his first equipment. 

He opened a studio first in South Delhi’s Greater Kailash area in 2008 and then in Gurugram in 2013. In 2011, he tattooed world record attempt recognized by Guinness World Records for the most number of flags to be tattooed on human body held by Guinness Rishi. He is one of the founders of the annual Heartwork Tattoo Festival, India’s only international tattoo festival. He is the owner of Devilz Tattooz, India.

Lokesh has traveled to 15 countries and tutored many artists. Some of celebrities and cricketers he has inked include Ishant Sharma, Shikhar Dhawan, Swara Bhaskar, Remo D'Souza, and Tapsee Pannu.

In 2019, he became the first artist from Asia to be invited to lecture at the University of Tattooing and Fine Arts, Academie Tier Polo, Italy.

References 

Tattoo artists
Indian male artists
Year of birth missing (living people)
Living people
Artists from Delhi
Delhi University alumni